David Meslin is community organizer and activist in Toronto.  He is the founder of the Toronto Public Space Committee and Cycle Toronto, and organized City Idol.  He was involved in founding 'Spacing' magazine, and has written a number of its articles.  He also founded the Ranked Ballot Initiative of Toronto. In 2010 he gave a TED (conference) Talk, The Antidote to Apathy. In 2019, he released the book Teardown: Rebuilding Democracy from the Ground Up, which covers his accumulated experience to date about his three main themes of "billboards, bicycles and ballots", and more, advocating of course for an intelligent redesign of our governance systems.

References

External links 
 Ranked Ballot Initiative of Toronto
 Mez Dispenser
 The Antidote to Apathy
 Teardown: Rebuilding Democracy from the Ground Up

Year of birth missing (living people)
Living people
Canadian activists